Christopher David Godsil is a professor and the former Chair at the Department of Combinatorics and Optimization in the faculty of mathematics at the University of Waterloo. He wrote the popular textbook on algebraic graph theory, entitled Algebraic Graph Theory, with Gordon Royle, His earlier textbook on algebraic combinatorics discussed  distance-regular graphs and association schemes.

Background

He started the Journal of Algebraic Combinatorics, and was the Editor-in-Chief of the Electronic Journal of Combinatorics from 2004 to 2008. He is also on the editorial board of the Journal of Combinatorial Theory Series B and Combinatorica.

He obtained his Ph.D. in 1979 at the University of Melbourne under the supervision of Derek Alan Holton. He wrote a paper with Paul Erdős, so making his Erdős number equal to 1.

Notes

References
  
 

Living people
Academic staff of the University of Waterloo
University of Melbourne alumni
Graph theorists
Year of birth missing (living people)